Frankston railway station, in Victoria, Australia, is the terminus of the suburban electrified Frankston line and diesel-hauled services on the Stony Point line. It serves the south-eastern Melbourne suburb of Frankston, and opened on 1 August 1882.

History
Frankston station opened on 1 August 1882, when the railway line was extended from Mordialloc. On 1 October 1888, the line was extended to Baxter.

In 1922, the signal box, which is located at the up end of the station and adjacent to the Beach Street pedestrian crossing, was provided, and controls the station, the stabling yards (located north, east and south of the station) and the Stony Point line, including Long Island Junction.

The station features briefly as a location in the 1959 Hollywood movie On the Beach.

Until late 1960, a  turntable existed at Frankston.

On 10 June 1975, diesel locomotive B69, operating an up Long Island steel freight train, collided with Hitachi carriage 27M at Frankston. That carriage became the first Hitachi car in the fleet to be scrapped.

Passenger services on the now-closed Mornington line originated and terminated at Frankston. On 20 May 1981, the last service operated, and the line was closed altogether on 15 June of that year. On 22 June of that year, the passenger service between Frankston and Stony Point was withdrawn and replaced with a bus service. However, unlike the Mornington line, Stony Point rail services were reinstated on 27 September 1984. Also in 1981, the goods yard was closed to traffic.

A level crossing once existed at Beach Street, at the up end of the station. In 1984, boom barriers replaced interlocked gates, and in 1990, the crossing was replaced by the Fletcher Road overpass.

In 1985, construction of the second station building commenced, and was completed by 1987. On 9 November 1995, Frankston was upgraded to a Premium Station.

In March 2011, an extension was made to Platform 2 at the up end of the station, to allow Stony Point and electrified metropolitan services to use the platform at the same time. During the 2011/2012 Financial Year, Frankston was the 10th-busiest station on Melbourne's metropolitan network, with 2.5 million passenger movements recorded.

During May and June 2018, the station was upgraded as part of a $63 million project. In May, the station was closed to allow the buildings constructed between 1985-1987 to be demolished. On 18 June of that year, the new station building opened to passengers.

On 22 January 2021, a six-car Comeng set derailed at the down end of the station.

Platforms and services
Frankston has one island platform with two faces, with the eastern side (Platform 2) split into a six-car platform for electric services towards Flinders Street, and a further two-car platform at the down end for Stony Point services.

It is served by Frankston and Stony Point line trains.

Platform 1:
  all stations and limited express services to Flinders Street, Werribee and Williamstown

Platform 2:
  all stations and limited express services to Flinders Street, Werribee and Williamstown

Platform 3:
  all stations services to Stony Point

Transport links
Cranbourne Transit operates three routes to and from Frankston station, under contract to Public Transport Victoria:
 : to Langwarrin
 : to Langwarrin
 : to Cranbourne station

Kinetic Melbourne operates one SmartBus route to and from Frankston station, under contract to Public Transport Victoria:
  : to Melbourne Airport

Ventura Bus Lines operates eighteen routes via Frankston station, under contract to Public Transport Victoria:
 : to Karingal Hub Shopping Centre
 : to Langwarrin
 : to Eliza Heights (Frankston)
 : to Frankston South
 : to Delacombe Park (Frankston)
 : to Lakewood (Frankston South)
 : to Pearcedale
 : to Belvedere Park Primary School (Seaford)
 : to Carrum station
 : to Mount Martha
 : to Flinders
 : to Hastings
 : to Osborne Primary School (Mount Martha)
 : to Mornington East
 : to Portsea
 : to Carrum Downs
 : to Carrum station
 : Rosebud – Monash University, Peninsula campus

Gallery

References

External links

 Melway map at street-directory.com.au

Premium Melbourne railway stations
Railway stations in Melbourne
Railway stations in Australia opened in 1882
Frankston, Victoria
Railway stations in the City of Frankston